Mazlizam Mohamad (born 19 September 1986) is a Malaysian footballer who plays as a defender for Perlis FA in the Malaysia Premier League.

He was a member of the Malaysia national under-23 football team and a member of the 2009 Laos Sea Games Football Gold medal winning squad. He has played for the Malaysian national football team, and in summer 2009 he played twice against Manchester United in their pre season tour of the Far East.

His first cap for Malaysia came in a friendly match against India on 13 November 2011.

References

External links
 

Malaysian footballers
Malaysia international footballers
Living people
Terengganu FC players
Perlis FA players
1986 births
People from Perlis
Malaysian people of Malay descent
Association football defenders